{{about|the 1996 film|the 1988 game|Star Trek: First Contact (video game)Star Trek: First Contact (video game)|the 1991 TV episode|First Contact (Star Trek: The Next Generation)First Contact (Star Trek: The Next Generation)}}Star Trek: First Contact is a 1996 American science fiction film directed by Jonathan Frakes (in his motion picture directorial debut) and based on the franchise Star Trek. It is the eighth film in the Star Trek film series, the second to star the cast of Star Trek: The Next Generation. In the film, the crew of the USS Enterprise-E travel back in time from the 24th century to the mid-21st century to stop the cybernetic Borg from conquering Earth by changing their past.

After the release of Star Trek Generations in 1994, Paramount Pictures tasked writers Brannon Braga and Ronald D. Moore with developing the next film in the series. Braga and Moore wanted to feature the Borg in the plot, while producer Rick Berman wanted a story involving time travel. The writers combined the two ideas; they initially set the film during the European Renaissance, but changed the time period that the Borg corrupted to the mid-21st century, after fearing the Renaissance idea would be "too kitsch". After two better-known directors turned down the job, cast member Jonathan Frakes was chosen to direct to make sure the task fell to someone who understood Star Trek.

The film's script required the creation of new starship designs, including a new USS Enterprise. Production designer Herman Zimmerman and illustrator John Eaves collaborated to make a sleeker ship than its predecessor. Principal photography began with weeks of location shooting in Arizona and California, before production moved to new sets for the ship-based scenes. The Borg were redesigned to appear as though they were converted into machine beings from the inside-out; the new makeup sessions took four times as long as their appearances on the television series. Effects company Industrial Light & Magic rushed to complete the film's special effects in less than five months. Traditional optical effects techniques were supplemented with computer-generated imagery. Jerry Goldsmith composed the film’s score.Star Trek: First Contact was released on November 22, 1996, and was the highest-grossing film on its opening weekend. It eventually made $92 million in the United States and Canada with an additional $54 million in other territories, combining to a worldwide total of $146 million. Critical reception was mostly positive; critics including Roger Ebert considered it to be one of the best Star Trek films, and it was the most positively reviewed film in the series (92% of reviews were positive) until being marginally surpassed (94%) by the 2009 reboot film. The Borg and the special effects were lauded, while characterization was less evenly received. Scholarly analysis of the film has focused on Captain Jean-Luc Picard's parallels to Herman Melville's Ahab and the nature of the Borg. First Contact was nominated for the Academy Award for Best Makeup and won three Saturn Awards. It was followed by Star Trek: Insurrection in 1998.

Plot
In the 24th century, Captain Jean-Luc Picard awakens from a nightmare in which he relives his assimilation by the cybernetic Borg six years earlier. He is contacted by Admiral Hayes, who informs him of a new Borg threat against Earth. Picard's orders are for his ship, to patrol the Neutral Zone in case of Romulan aggression; Starfleet is worried that Picard is too emotionally involved with the Borg to join the fight.

Learning the fleet is losing the battle, the Enterprise crew disobeys orders and heads for Earth, where a single Borg Cube ship holds its own against a group of Starfleet vessels. Picard takes control of the fleet and directs the surviving ships to concentrate their firepower on a seemingly unimportant point on the Borg ship. The Cube launches a smaller sphere ship towards Earth before being destroyed. Enterprise pursues the sphere into a temporal vortex. As the sphere disappears, Enterprise discovers Earth has been altered – it is now populated by Borg. Realizing the Borg have used time travel to change the past, Enterprise follows the sphere through the vortex.Enterprise arrives hundreds of years in its past on April 4, 2063, the day before Zefram Cochrane's historic warp drive flight that leads to humanity's first encounter with alien life. The crew realizes the Borg are trying to prevent first contact and assimilate humanity while the planet is reeling from a devastating nuclear war. After destroying the Borg sphere, an away team transports down to Cochrane's ship, Phoenix, in Bozeman, Montana. Picard has Cochrane's assistant Lily Sloane sent back to Enterprise for medical attention. The captain returns to the ship and leaves Commander William T. Riker on Earth to make sure Phoenixs flight proceeds as planned. While in the future Cochrane is seen as a hero, in reality he built the Phoenix for financial gain and is reluctant to be the historic figure the crew describes.

A group of Borg invade Enterprises lower decks, assimilating crew and modifying the ship. Picard and a team attempt to reach engineering to disable the Borg with a corrosive gas, but are forced back; the android Data is captured in the melee. A frightened Lily corners Picard with a weapon, but he gains her trust. The two escape the Borg-infested area of the ship by creating a diversion in the holodeck. Picard, Worf, and the ship's navigator, Lieutenant Hawk, travel outside the ship in space suits to stop the Borg from calling reinforcements by using the navigational deflector, but Hawk is assimilated in the process. As the Borg continue to assimilate more decks, Worf suggests destroying the ship, but Picard angrily calls him a coward. Lily confronts the captain and makes him realize he is acting irrationally because of his own past with the Borg. Picard orders an activation of the ship's self-destruct, then orders the crew to head for the escape pods while he stays behind to rescue Data.

As Cochrane, Riker, and engineer Geordi La Forge prepare to activate the warp drive on Phoenix, Picard discovers that the Borg Queen has grafted human skin onto Data, giving him the sensation of touch he has long desired so that she can obtain the android's encryption codes to the Enterprise computer.

Although Picard offers himself to the Borg in exchange for Data's freedom and willingly become Locutus again, Data refuses to leave. He deactivates the self-destruct and fires torpedoes at Phoenix. At the last moment the torpedoes miss, and the Queen realizes Data betrayed her. The android ruptures a coolant tank, and the corrosive vapor eats away the biological components of the Borg. With the Borg threat neutralized, Cochrane completes his warp flight. The next day the crew watches from a distance as an alien Vulcan ship, attracted by the Phoenix warp test, lands on Earth. Cochrane  greets the aliens. Having ensured the correction of the timeline, Picard bids Lily farewell and the Enterprise crew slip away and return to the 24th century.

CastFirst Contact is the first film in the Star Trek film series in which none of the main characters from The Original Series appear. Rather, the main cast of Star Trek: The Next Generation play the following characters:
 Patrick Stewart as Jean-Luc Picard, the captain of the USS Enterprise-E who is haunted by his time as a member of the Borg. Stewart was one of the few cast members who had an important role in developing the script, offering suggestions and comments. Picard's character was changed from the "angst-ridden character [viewers have] seen before", to an action hero type. Stewart noted that Picard was more physically active in the film compared to his usual depiction.
 Jonathan Frakes as William T. Riker, the ship's first officer who leads the away team on Earth. Frakes said he did not have much difficulty directing and acting at the same time, having done so on the television series.
 Brent Spiner as Data, an android and the ship's second officer, who endeavors to become human. Rumors before the film's release suggested that since Data's skin had been largely removed at the end of the story, it would allow another actor to assume the role.
 LeVar Burton as Geordi La Forge, the ship's chief engineer who helps repair the Phoenix. La Forge was born blind, and for the television series and previous film had worn a special VISOR to see. Burton lobbied for many years to have his character's visor replaced so that people could see his eyes, since the "air filter" he wore prevented the audience from seeing his eyes and limited his acting ability. Moore finally agreed, giving the character ocular implants that were never explained in the film, beyond showing they were artificial.
 Michael Dorn as Worf, the commander of the USS Defiant and Picard's former chief of security.
 Gates McFadden as Beverly Crusher, the ship's doctor. In an interview before the film's premiere, McFadden said she considered women finally on par with the men in Star Trek: "We've come a long way since Majel Barrett was stuck in the sick bay as Nurse Chapel in the [1960s] and made to dye her hair blond."
 Marina Sirtis as Deanna Troi, counselor aboard the Enterprise. Sirtis missed working on the television show, and was acutely aware that expectations and stakes for First Contact were high; "we were scared that people thought we couldn't cut it without the original cast", she said.
 Alfre Woodard as Lily Sloane, Cochrane's assistant. When Frakes first moved to Los Angeles, Woodard was one of the first people he met. During a conversation at a barbecue Woodard said she would become Frakes' godmother, as he did not have one. Through this relationship, Frakes was able to cast Woodard in the film; he considered it a coup to land an Academy Award-nominated actress. Woodard considered Lily to be the character most like herself out of all the roles she has played.
 James Cromwell as Zefram Cochrane, the pilot and creator of Earth's first warp capable vessel. The character of Zefram Cochrane had first appeared in The Original Series episode "Metamorphosis", played by Glenn Corbett. Cromwell's Cochrane is much older and has no resemblance to Corbett, which did not bother the writers. They wanted to portray Cochrane as a character going through a major transition; he starts out as a cynical, selfish drunk who is changed by the characters he meets over the course of the film. Although the character was written with Cromwell in mind, Tom Hanks, a big fan of Star Trek, was considered for the role by Paramount, though producer Rick Berman stated, "I’m sure his name was floated in some capacity, but it was never really on the table." Frakes commented that it would have been a mistake to cast Hanks as Cochrane due to his being so well known. Cromwell had a long previous association with Star Trek, having played characters in The Next Generation episodes "The Hunted" and "Birthright", as well as a role in Star Trek: Deep Space Nine. "[Cromwell] actually came in and read for the part", Frakes said. "He nailed it." Cromwell described his method of portraying Cochrane as always playing himself. Part of the actor's interest in the film was his involvement in Steven M. Greer's Center for the Study of Extraterrestrial Intelligence, which offers training for first contact scenarios.
 Alice Krige as the Borg Queen, the controller of the cybernetic collective. Casting for the part took time as the actress needed to be sexy, dangerous, and mysterious. Frakes cast Krige after finding that she had all of the mentioned qualities, and being impressed by her performance in Ghost Story; the director considers her the sexiest Star Trek villain of all time. Krige suffered a large amount of discomfort filming her role; her costume was too tight, causing blisters, and the painful silver contact lenses she wore could only be kept in for four minutes at a time.

The film also introduced the voice of the Borg character, played by Jeff Coopwood,Special Guests. 55 Year Mission Tour. Creation Entertainment. 2021. Retrieved July 31, 2021 uttering the memorable line: "Resistance is futile," which was also the film's tagline. The Borg's ominous warning was: "We are the Borg. Lower your shields and surrender your ships. We will add your biological and technological distinctiveness to our own. Your culture will adapt to service us. Resistance is futile."Science Fiction and the Abolition of Man Finding C. S. Lewis in Sci-fi Film and Television. Kevin C. Neece, Brian Godawa. 2017. Pickwick Publications. . Retrieved August 3, 2021

Several of The Next Generations recurring characters also appeared in the film; Dwight Schultz reprised his role of Lieutenant Reginald Barclay and Patti Yasutake briefly appeared as Nurse Alyssa Ogawa. Whoopi Goldberg was not asked to return as Guinan, a wise bartender whose homeworld was destroyed by the Borg. Goldberg only learned about the decision through the newspapers. "What can I say? I wanted to do it because I didn't think you could do anything about the Borg without [my character]", she said, "but apparently you can, so they don't need me."

Michael Horton appears as a bloodied and stoic Starfleet Security Officer; his character would be given the name Lt. Daniels in the next Star Trek film. Neal McDonough plays Lt. Hawk, the Enterprise helmsman who aids in the defense of the ship until he is assimilated and killed. McDonough was cavalier about his role as a disposable "redshirt", saying that since one of the characters in the deflector dish battle had to die, "that would be me".

The third draft of the script added cameos by two actors from the sister television series Star Trek: Voyager, which was in its third season when the film was released. Robert Picardo appears as the Enterprises Emergency Medical Hologram; Picardo played the holographic Doctor in Voyager. He won the cameo after suggesting to producers that the Enterprise should have the same technology as Voyager. Picardo's line "I'm a doctor, not a door stop", is an allusion to the Star Trek original series character Dr. Leonard McCoy. Picardo's fellow Voyager actor Ethan Phillips, who played Neelix, cameos as a nightclub maître d' in the holodeck scene. Phillips recalled that the producers wanted the fans to be left guessing whether he was the person who played Neelix or not, as he did not appear in the credits; "It was just kind of a goofy thing to do." During production, there were incorrect rumors that Avery Brooks would reprise his role as Star Trek: Deep Space Nine captain Benjamin Sisko. As with many Star Trek productions, new, disposable redshirt characters are killed off over the course of the plot.

Production

Development
In December 1992, Paramount Pictures executives approached Star Trek: The Next Generation producer Rick Berman and engaged him to create two films featuring the cast of the television series. Berman decided to develop two screenplays simultaneously, and prioritize the most promising one for the first film. The effort of writers Brannon Braga and Ronald D. Moore was chosen and developed into Star Trek Generations. Two months after the release of Generations, Paramount decided to produce the second feature for a winter holiday 1996 release. Paramount wanted Braga and Moore, who had written the Generations script and a number of Next Generation episodes, to pen the screenplay. Berman told Braga and Moore that he wanted them to think about doing a story involving time travel. Braga and Moore, meanwhile, wanted to use the Borg. "Right on the spot, we said maybe we can do both, the Borg and time travel," Moore recalled. The Borg had not been seen in full force since the fourth-season episode of The Next Generation, "The Best of Both Worlds" and had never been heavily featured in the series due to budget constraints and the fear that they would lose their scare factor. "The Borg were really liked by the fans, and we liked them," Moore said. "They were fearsome. They were unstoppable. Perfect foils for a feature story."

In deciding to combine the two-story ideas, the writers decided that the time travel element could play out as the Borg attempt to prevent humanity from ever reaching space and becoming a threat. "Our goals at that point were to create a story that was wonderful and a script that was [...] producible within the budget confines of a Star Trek film", said Berman. One major question was identifying the time period to which the Borg would travel. Berman's suggestion was the Renaissance; the Borg would attempt to prevent the dawn of modern European civilization. The first story draft, titled Star Trek: Renaissance, had the crew of the Enterprise track the Borg to their hive in a castle dungeon. The film would have featured sword fights alongside phasers in 15th-century Europe, while Data became Leonardo da Vinci's apprentice. Moore was afraid that it risked becoming campy and over-the-top, while Stewart refused to wear tights. Braga, meanwhile, wanted to see the "birth of Star Trek", when the Vulcans and humans first met; "that, to me, is what made the time travel story fresh", he said.

With the idea of Star Treks genesis in mind, the central story became Cochrane's warp drive test and humanity's first contact. Drawing on clues from previous Star Trek episodes, Cochrane was placed in mid-21st-century Montana, where humans recover from a devastating world war. In the first script with this setting, the Borg attack Cochrane's lab, leaving the scientist comatose; Picard assumes Cochrane's place to continue the warp test and restore history. In this draft Picard has a love interest in the local photographer Ruby, while Riker leads the fight against the Borg on the Enterprise. Another draft included John de Lancie's omnipotent character Q. Looking at the early scripts, the trio knew that serious work was needed. "It just didn't make sense [...] that Picard, the one guy who has a history with the Borg, never meets them," Braga recalled. Riker's and Picard's roles were swapped, and the planetside story was shortened and told differently. Braga and Moore focused the new arc on Cochrane himself, making the ideal future of Star Trek come from a flawed man. The idea of Borg fighting among period costumes coalesced into a "Dixon Hill" holographic novel sequence on the holodeck. The second draft, titled Star Trek: Resurrection, was judged complete enough that the production team used it to plan expenses. The film was given a budget of $45 million, "considerably more" than Generations $35 million price tag; this allowed the production to plan a larger amount of action and special effects.

Braga and Moore intended the film to be easily accessible to any moviegoer and work as a stand-alone story, yet still satisfy the devoted Star Trek fans. Since much of Picard's role made a direct reference to his time as a Borg in The Next Generation episodes "The Best of Both Worlds", the opening dream sequence was added to explain what happened to him in the show. The pair discarded an opening which would have established what the main characters had been doing since the last film in favor of quickly setting the story. While the writers tried to preserve the idea of the Borg as a mindless collective in the original draft, Paramount head Jonathan Dolgen felt that the script was not dramatic enough. He suggested adding an individual Borg villain with whom the characters could interact, which led to the creation of the Borg Queen.

Cast member Frakes was chosen to direct. Frakes had not been the first choice for director; Ridley Scott and John McTiernan reportedly turned down the project. Stewart met a potential candidate and concluded that "they didn't know Star Trek". It was decided to stay with someone who understood the "gestalt of Star Trek", and Frakes was given the job. Frakes reported to work every day at 6:30 am. A major concern during the production was security—the script to Generations had been leaked online, and stronger measures were taken to prevent a similar occurrence. Some script pages were distributed on red paper to foil attempted photocopies or faxes; "We had real trouble reading them," Frakes noted.

Frakes had directed multiple episodes of The Next Generation, Deep Space Nine and Voyager, but First Contact was his first feature film. Whereas Frakes had seven days of preparation followed by seven days of shooting for a given television episode, the director was given a ten-week preparation period before twelve weeks of filming, and had to get used to shooting for a 2.35:1 anamorphic ratio instead of the television standard 1.33:1. In preparation, he watched Jaws, Close Encounters of the Third Kind, 2001: A Space Odyssey and the works of James Cameron and Ridley Scott.

Throughout multiple script revisions a number of titles were considered, including Star Trek: Borg, Star Trek: Destinies, Star Trek: Future Generations and Star Trek: Generations II. The planned title of Resurrection was scrapped when 20th Century Fox announced the title of the fourth Alien film as Alien Resurrection; the film was rebranded First Contact on May 3, 1996.

DesignFirst Contact was the first Star Trek film to make significant use of computer-generated starship models, though physical miniatures were still used for the most important vessels. With the Enterprise-D destroyed during the events of Generations, the task of creating a new starship fell to veteran Star Trek production designer Herman Zimmerman. The script's only guide on the appearance of the vessel was the line "the new Enterprise sleekly comes out of the nebula". Working with illustrator John Eaves, the designers conceived the new Sovereign-class Enterprise-E as "leaner, sleeker, and mean enough to answer any Borg threat you can imagine". Braga and Moore intended it to be more muscular and militaryesque. Eaves looked at the structure of previous Enterprise iterations, and designed a more streamlined, capable war vessel than the Enterprise-D, reducing the neck area of the ship and lengthening the nacelles. Eaves produced 30 to 40 sketches before he found a final design he liked and began making minor changes. Working from blueprints created by Paramount's Rick Sternbach, the model shop at effects house Industrial Light & Magic (ILM) fabricated a  miniature over a five-month period. Hull patterns were carved out of wood, then cast and assembled over an aluminum armature. The model's panels were painted in an alternating matte and gloss scheme to add texture. The crew had multiple difficulties in prepping the miniature for filming; while the model shop originally wanted to save time by casting windows using a clear fiberglass, the material came out tacky. ILM instead cut the windows using a laser. Slides of the sets were added behind the window frames to make the interior seem more dimensional when the camera tracked past the ship.

In previous films, Starfleet's range of capital ships had been predominantly represented by the Constitution-class Enterprise and just five other ship classes: the Miranda class from Star Trek II: The Wrath of Khan, the Excelsior and the Oberth class from Star Trek III: The Search for Spock, and the Galaxy and Nebula classes from The Next Generation. ILM supervisor John Knoll insisted that First Contacts space battle prove the breadth of Starfleet's ship configurations. "Starfleet would probably throw everything it could at the Borg, including ships we've never seen before," he reasoned. "And since we figured a lot of the background action in the space battle would need to be done with computer-generated ships that needed to be built from scratch anyway, I realized there was no reason not to do some new designs." Alex Jaeger was appointed visual effects art director to the film and assigned the task of creating four new starships. Paramount wanted ships that would look different from a distance, so the director devised multiple hull profiles. Knoll and Jaeger had decided that the ships had to obey certain Star Trek ship precedents, with a saucer-like primary hull and elongated warp nacelles in pairs. The Akira class featured the traditional saucer section and nacelles combined with a catamaran-style double hull; the Norway class was based on the USS Voyager; the Saber class was a smaller ship with nacelles trailing off the tips of its saucer section; and the Steamrunner class featured twin nacelles trailing off the saucer and connected by an engineering section in the rear. Each design was modeled as a three-dimensional digital wire-frame model for use in the film.

The film also required a number of smaller non-Starfleet designs. Eaves made sure to emphasize the mechanical aspect of the ship, to suggest it was a highly experimental and untested technology. The Phoenixs cockpit labels came from McDonnell-Douglas space shuttle manuals. Eaves considered the Vulcan ship a "fun" vessel to design. Only two major Vulcan ships had been previously seen in Star Trek, including a courier vessel from The Motion Picture. Since the two-engine ship format had been seen many times, the artists decided to step away from the traditional ship layout, creating a more artistic than functional design. The ship incorporated elements of a starfish and a crab. Because of budget constraints, the full ship was realized as a computer-generated design. Only a boomerang-shaped landing foot was fabricated for the actors to interact with.

The Enterprise interior sets were mostly new designs. The bridge was designed to be comfortable-looking, with warm colors. Among the new additions was a larger holographic viewscreen that would operate only when activated, leaving a plain wall when disabled. New flatscreen computer monitors were used for displays, using less space and giving the bridge a cleaner look. The new monitors also allowed for video playback that could simulate interaction with the actors. The designers created a larger and less-spartan ready room, retaining elements from the television series; Zimmerman added a set of golden three-dimensional Enterprise models to a glass case in the corner. The observation lounge was similar to the design in the Enterprise-D; the set itself was re-used from the television show, the only such set not to be struck following the filming of Generations, though it was expanded and underwent a color change. Engineering was simulated with a large, three-story set, corridors, a lobby, and the largest warp core in the franchise to date. For its Borg-corrupted state, the engineering section was outfitted with Borg drone alcoves, conduits and Data's "assimilation table" where he is interrogated by the Queen. Some existing sets were used to save money; sickbay was a redress of the same location from Voyager, while the USS Defiant scenes used Deep Space Nines standing set. Some set designs took inspiration from the Alien film series, Star Wars and 2001: A Space Odyssey.

The spacewalk scene on the Enterprise exterior was one of the most challenging sets to envision and construct for the film. The production had to design a space suit that looked practical rather than exaggerated. Fans were built into the helmets so that the actors would not get overheated, and neon lights built into the front so that the occupant's faces could be seen. When the actors first put the helmets on, the fully enclosed design made it hard to breathe; after a minute of wearing the suit Stewart became ill, and shooting was discontinued. The set for the ship's outer hull and deflector dish were built on gimbals at Paramount's largest sound stage, surrounded by bluescreen and rigged with wires for the zero gravity sequences. The stage was not large enough to accommodate a full-sized replica of the Enterprise dish, so Zimmerman had to scale down the plans by 15 percent.

Costumes and makeup
The Starfleet uniforms were redesigned for the film by the Star Trek costumer Bob Blackman to give a more militaristic feel, with grey padded shoulders, black torso/sleeves/leggings and colored undershirts/stripe cuffs. The new uniforms from this film were later adopted in the fifth season of Star Trek: Deep Space Nine, beginning with "Rapture" and for the rest of the series, but the crew on Star Trek: Voyager continued to use the old DS9 uniforms, due to being stuck in the Delta Quadrant. Since Blackman was also handling the costumes for the television series, non-Starfleet design clothes were delegated to Deborah Everton, a newcomer to Star Trek who was responsible for more than 800 costumes during production. Everton was tasked with updating the Borg's costumes to something new, but reminiscent of the television series. The bulky suits were made sleeker and outfitted with fiber optic lights. The time-travel aspect of the story also required period costumes for the mid 21st century and the 1940s "Dixon Hill" nightclub holodeck recreation. Everton enjoyed designing Woodard's costumes because the character went through many changes during the course of the film, switching from a utilitarian vest and pants in many shots to a glamorous dress during the holodeck scene.

Everton and makeup designers Michael Westmore, Scott Wheeler, and Jake Garber wanted to upgrade the pasty white look the Borg had retained since The Next Generations second season, born out of a need for budget-conscious television design. "I wanted it to look like they were [assimilated or "Borgified"] from the inside out rather than the outside in," Everton said. Each Borg had a slightly different design, and Westmore designed a new one each day to make it appear that there was an army of Borg; in reality, between eight and twelve actors filled all the roles as the costumes and makeup were so expensive to produce. Background Borg were simulated by half-finished mannequins. Westmore reasoned that since the Borg had traveled the galaxy, they would have assimilated other races besides humans. In the television series, much of the Borg's faces had been covered by helmets, but for First Contact the makeup artist removed the head coverings and designed assimilated versions of familiar Star Trek aliens such as Klingons, Bolians, Romulans, Bajorans, and Cardassians. Each drone received an electronic eyepiece. The blinking lights in each eye were programmed by Westmore's son to repeat a production member's name in Morse code.

The makeup time for the Borg expanded from the single hour needed for television to five hours, in addition to the 30 minutes necessary to get into costume and 90 minutes to remove the makeup at the end of the day. While Westmore estimated that a fully staffed production would have around 50 makeup artists, First Contact had to make do with fewer than ten people involved in preparation, and at most 20 artists a day. Despite the long hours, Westmore's teams began to be more creative with the prosthetics even as they decreased their preparation times. "They were using two tubes, and then they were using three tubes, and then they were sticking tubes in the ears and up the nose," Westmore explained. "And we were using a very gooey caramel coloring, maybe using a little bit of it, but by the time we got to the end of the movie we had the stuff dripping down the side of [the Borg's] faces—it looked like they were leaking oil! So, at the very end [of the film], they're more ferocious."

The Borg Queen was a challenge because she had to be unique among Borg but still retain human qualities; Westmore was conscious of avoiding comparisons to films like Alien. The final appearance involved pale gray skin and an elongated, oval head, with coils of wire rather than hair. Krige recalled the first day she had her makeup applied: "I saw everyone cringing. I thought, great; they made this, and they've scared themselves!" Frakes noted that the Queen ended up being alluring in a disturbing way, despite her evil behavior and appearance. Zimmerman, Everton and Westmore combined their efforts to design and create the Borgified sections of the Enterprise to build tension and to make the audience feel that "[they are being fed] the Borg".

Filming
Principal photography took a more leisurely pace than on The Next Generation because of a less hectic schedule; only four pages of script had to be filmed each day, as opposed to eight on the television series. First Contact saw the introduction of cinematographer Matthew F. Leonetti to the Star Trek franchise; Frakes hired him out of admiration for some of his previous work on films such as Poltergeist and Strange Days. Leonetti was unfamiliar with the Star Trek mythos when Frakes approached him; to prepare for the assignment, he studied the previous four films in the franchise, each with a different cinematographer—The Voyage Home (Donald Peterman), The Final Frontier (Andrew Laszlo), The Undiscovered Country (Hiro Narita), and Generations (John Alonzo). The cameraman also spent several days at the sets of Voyager and Deep Space Nine to observe filming.

Leonetti devised multiple lighting methods for the Enterprise interiors for ship standard operations, "Red alert" status, and emergency power. He reasoned that since the ship was being taken over by a foreign entity, it required more dramatic lighting and framing. While much of the footage was shot at 50–70 mm focal lengths using anamorphic lenses, 14 mm spherical lenses were used for Borg's-eye-view shots. Leonetti preferred shooting with long lenses to provide a more claustrophobic feel, but made sure the length did not flatten the image. Handheld cameras were used for battle sequences so that viewers were brought into the action and the camera could follow the movements of the actors. The Borg scenes were received positively by test-screening audiences, so once the rest of the film had been completed, a Borg assimilation scene of the Enterprise crew was added in using some of the money left in the budget to add action.

Since so many new sets had to be created, the production commenced filming with location photography. Four days were spent in the Titan Missile Museum, south of Tucson, Arizona—the disarmed nuclear missile was fitted with a fiberglass capsule shell to stand in for the Phoenixs booster and command module. The old missile silo provided a large set that the budget would have prohibited building from scratch, but the small size created difficulties. Each camera move was planned in advance to work around areas where the lighting would be added, and electricians and grips donned rock-climbing harnesses to move down the shaft and attach the lights. To give greater dimension to the rocket and lend the missile a futuristic appearance, Leonetti chose to offset the missile's metallic surface with complementary colors. Using different-colored gels made the rocket appear longer than it actually was; to complete the effect, shots from the Phoenixs nose downwards and from the engines up were filmed with a 30 mm lens to lengthen the missile.

After the completion of the Phoenix shots, the crew moved to two weeks of nighttime shooting in the Angeles National Forest. Zimmerman created a village of fourteen huts to stand in for Montana; the cast enjoyed the scenes as a chance to escape their uniforms and wear "normal" clothes. The last location shoot was at an art deco restaurant in Los Angeles' Union Station, which stood in for the Dixon Hill holonovel; Frakes wanted a sharp contrast with the dark, mechanical Borg scenes. While the cinematographer wanted to shoot the scene in black and white, Paramount executives deemed the test footage "too experimental" and the idea was dropped. The site made using high-wattage lights impractical, so Leonetti opted to use dimmer master lights near the ceiling and took advantage of a large window to shine diffused lights through. To give the scene a black-and-white feel, Leonetti made sure to use light without any coloration. "I like creating separation with lighting as opposed to using color," he explained. "You can't always rely on color because the actor might start to melt into the background." By separating the backlights, Leonetti made sure that the principal actors stood out of the backdrop. The shoot used a ten-piece orchestra, 15 stuntmen, and 120 extras to fill the seats. Among the nightclub patrons were Braga, Moore, and the film's stunt coordinator, Ronnie Rondell.

After location shooting was completed, shooting on the new Engineering set began May 3. The set lasted less than a day in its pristine condition before it was "Borgified". Filming then proceeded to the bridge. During normal operation scenes, Leonetti chose to cast crosslighting on the principals; this required the ceiling of the set to be removed and lighting grids to be situated around the sides. These lights were then directed towards the actors' faces at 90-degree angles. The set was lined with window paneling backed by red lights, which would blink intermittently during red-alert status. These lights were supplemented by what Leonetti called "interactive light"; these were off-stage, red-gelled lights that cast flashing rims on the bridge set and heads of the crew. For the Borg intrusion, the lighting originated solely from instrument panels and red-alert displays. The fill light on these scenes was reduced so that the cast would pass through dark spots on the bridge and interiors out of the limited range of these sources. Small 30- and 50-watt lights were used to throw localized shafts of light onto the sets.

Next came the action sequences and the battle for the Enterprise, a phase the filmmakers dubbed "Borg Hell". Frakes directed the Borg scenes similar to a horror film, creating as much suspense as possible. To balance these elements he added more comedic elements to the Earth scenes, intended to momentarily relieve the audience of tension before building it up again. Leonetti reconfigured the lighting to reflect the takeover of the ship interiors. "When the ship gets Borgified, everything is changed into more of a squared-off, robotic look with sharp edges but rounded images," he explained. To give the corridor walls more shape, Leonetti lit them from underneath. Since the halls were so small and the ceilings would be visible in many of the shots, special attention was paid to hiding the light fixtures.

For the live-action spacewalk scenes, visual-effects supervisor Ronald B. Moore spent two weeks of bluescreen photography at the deflector set. Frakes regarded filming the scene to be the most tedious in the film because of the amount of preparation it took for each day's shoot. Since the rest of the Enterprise-E, as well as the backdrop of Earth, were to be added later in post-production, it became confusing to coordinate shots. Moore used a laptop with digital reproductions of the set to orient the crew and help Frakes understand what the finished shot would look like. A one-armed actor portrayed the Borg whose arm Worf slices off to accurately portray the effect intended, and the actors' shoes were fitted with lead weights to remind the actors they were to move slowly as if actually wearing gravity boots. McDonough recalled that he joined Stewart and Dorn in asking whether they could do the shots without the  weights, as "they hired us because we are actors", but the production insisted on using them.

The last scene filmed was the film's first, Picard's Borg nightmare. One camera shot begins inside the iris of Picard's eyeball and pulls back to reveal the captain aboard a massive Borg ship. The shot continues to pull back and reveal the exterior of a Borg ship. The scene was inspired by a New York City production of Sweeney Todd: the Demon Barber of Fleet Street in which the stage surrounded the audience, giving a sense of realism. The shot was filmed as three separate elements merged with digital effects. The crew used a 50 mm lens to make it easier for the effects team to dissolve the closeup shots with the other elements. Starting from Stewart's eye, the camera pulled back , requiring the key light to increase in intensity up to 1,000 foot-candles so that there was enough depth to keep the eye sharp. The surface of the stage proved too uneven to accomplish the smooth dolly pullback required by the effects team, who needed a steady shot to blend a computer-generated version of Picard's eye with the pullback. The  dolly track was raised off the stage floor and layered with pieces of double-thick birch plywood, chosen for its smooth finish. Principal photography finished on July 2, 1996, two days over schedule but still under budget. Shooting took a total of sixty days.

Effects
The majority of First Contacts effects were handled by Industrial Light & Magic under the supervision of John Knoll. Smaller effects sequences, such as phaser fire, computer graphics, and transporter effects, were delegated to a team led by visual-effects supervisor David Takemura. Accustomed to directing episodes for the television series, Frakes was frequently reminded by effects artist Terry Frazee to "think big, blow everything up". Most of the effects sequences were planned using low-resolution computer-generated animatics. These rough animated storyboards established length, action and composition, allowing the producers and director to ascertain how the sequences would play out before they were shot.First Contact was the last film to feature a physical model of the Enterprise. For the ship's dramatic introduction, the effects team combined motion control shots of the Enterprise model with a computer-generated background. Sequence supervisor Dennis Turner, who had created Generations energy ribbon and specialized in creating natural phenomena, was charged with creating the star cluster, modeled after the Eagle Nebula. The nebular columns and solid areas were modeled with basic wireframe geometry, with surface shaders applied to make the edges of the nebula glow. A particle render that ILM had devised for the earlier tornado film Twister was used to create a turbulent look within the nebula. Once the shots of the Enterprise had been captured, Turner inserted the ship into the computer-generated background and altered its position until the images matched up.

The opening beauty pass of the new Enterprise was the responsibility of visual-effects cinematographer Marty Rosenberg, who handled all the other miniatures, explosions, and some live-action bluescreen elements. Rosenberg had previously shot some of the Enterprise-D effects for Generations, but had to adjust his techniques for the new model; the cinematographer used a 50 mm lens instead of the 35 mm used for Generations because the smaller lens made the new Enterprises dish appear stretched out. Knoll decided to shoot the model from above and below as much as possible; side views made the ship appear too flat and elongated. Rosenberg preferred motion-control passes of ships over computer-generated versions, as it was much easier to capture a high level of detail with physical models rather than trying to recreate it by computer graphics.

For the Borg battle, Knoll insisted on closeup shots that were near the alien vessel, necessitating a physical model. ILM layered their  model with an additional five inches of etched brass over a glowing neon lightbox for internal illumination. To make the Borg vessel appear even larger than it was, Knoll made sure that an edge of it was facing the camera like the prow of a ship and that the Cube broke the edges of the frame. To give the Cube greater depth and texture, Rosenberg shot the vessel with harsher light. "I created this really odd, raking three-quarter backlight coming from the right or left side, which I balanced out with nets and a couple of little lights. I wanted it to look scary and mysterious, so it was lit like a point, and we always had the camera dutched to it; we never just had it coming straight at us," he said. Small lights attached to the Cube's surface helped to create visual interest and convey scale; the model was deliberately shot with a slow, determined pacing to contrast with the Federation ships engaged in battle with the Borg. The impact of Federation weaponry on the Borg Cube was simulated using a  model of the Cube. The model had specific areas which could be blown up multiple times without damaging the miniature. For the final explosion of the Cube, Rosenberg shot ten  Cube miniatures with explosive-packed lightweight skins. The Cubes were suspended from pipes sixty feet above the camera on the ground. Safety glass was placed over the lens to prevent damage, while the camera was covered with plywood to protect it from bits of plastic that rained down after each explosion. The smaller Borg sphere was a  model that was shot separately from the Cube and digitally added in post-production. The time-travel vortex the Sphere creates was simulated with a rocket re-entry effect; bowshock forms in front of the ship, then streams backwards at high speed. Interactive lighting was played across the computer-generated Enterprise model for when the ship is caught in the time vortex.

The miniature Enterprise was again used for the spacewalk sequence. Even on the large model, it was hard to make the miniature appear realistic in extreme close-up shots. To make the pullback shot work, the camera had to be within one eighth of an inch from the model. Painter Kim Smith spent several days on a tiny area of the model to add enough surface detail for the close-up, but even then the focus was barely adequate. To compensate, the crew used a wider-angle lens and shot at the highest f-stop they could. The live-action scenes of the spacewalking crew were then digitally added. Wide shots used footage of photo doubles walking across a large bluescreen draped across ILM's parking lot at night.

ILM was tasked with imagining what the immediate assimilation of an Enterprise crewmember would look like. Jaeger came up with a set of cables that sprang from the Borg's knuckles and buried themselves in the crewmember's neck. Wormlike tubes would course through the victim's body and mechanical devices break the skin. The entire transformation was created using computer-generated imagery. The wormlike geometry was animated over the actor's face, then blended in with the addition of a skin texture over the animation. The gradual change in skin tone was simulated with shaders.

Frakes considered the entrance of the Borg Queen—when her head, shoulders, and steel spine are lowered by cables and attached to her body—as the "signature visual effect in the film". The scene was difficult to execute, taking ILM five months to finish. Jaeger devised a rig that would lower the actress on the set, and applied a prosthetic spine over a blue suit so that ILM could remove Krige's lower body. This strategy enabled the filmmakers to incorporate as many live-action elements as possible without resorting to further digital effects. To make the prosthetics appear at the proper angle when her lower body was removed, Krige extended her neck forward so it appeared in line with the spine. Knoll did not want it to seem that the Queen was on a hard, mechanical rig; "we wanted her to have the appropriate 'float'," he explained. Using separate motion control passes on the set, Knoll shot the lower of the upper torso and the secondary sequence with Krige's entire body. A digital version of the Borg body suit was used for the lowering sequence, at which point the image was morphed back to the real shot of Krige's body. The animated claws of the suit were created digitally as well using a detailed model. As reference to the animators, the shot required Krige to realistically portray "the strange pain or satisfaction of being reconnected to her body".

Music
Jerry Goldsmith scored First Contact, his third Star Trek feature. He wrote a sweeping main title which begins with Alexander Courage's Star Trek fanfare. Instead of composing a menacing theme to underscore the Borg, Goldsmith wrote a pastoral theme linked to humanity's hopeful first contact. The theme uses a four-note motif used in Goldsmith's Star Trek V: The Final Frontier score, which is used in First Contact as a friendship theme and general thematic link.Bond, 156. A menacing march with touches of synthesizers was used to represent the Borg. In addition to composing new music, Goldsmith used music from his previous Star Trek scores, including his theme from The Motion Picture. The Klingon theme from the same film is used to represent Worf.

Because of delays with Paramount's The Ghost and the Darkness, the already-short four-week production schedule was cut to just three weeks. While Berman was concerned about the move, Goldsmith hired his son, Joel, to assist. The young composer provided additional music for the film, writing three cues based on his father's motifs and a total of 22 minutes of music. Joel used variations of his father's Borg music and the Klingon theme as Worf fights hand-to-hand (Joel said that he and his father decided to use the theme for Worf separately). When the Borg invade sickbay and the medical hologram distracts them, Joel wrote what critic Jeff Bond termed "almost Coplandesque" material of tuning strings and clarinet, but the cue was unused. While Joel composed many of the film's action cues, his father contributed to the spacewalk and Phoenix flight sequences. During the fight on the deflector dish, Goldsmith used low-register electronics punctuated by stabs of violent, dissonant strings.

In a break with Star Trek film tradition, the soundtrack incorporated two licensed songs: Roy Orbison's "Ooby Dooby" and Steppenwolf's "Magic Carpet Ride". GNP Crescendo president Neil Norman explained that the decision to include the tracks was controversial, but said that "Frakes did the most amazing job of integrating those songs into the story that we had to use them".

GNP released the First Contact soundtrack on December 2, 1996. The album contained 51 minutes of music, with 35 minutes of Jerry Goldsmith's score, 10 minutes of additional music by Joel Goldsmith, "Ooby Dooby" and "Magic Carpet Ride". The compact disc shipped with CD-ROM features only accessible if played on a personal computer, including interviews with Berman, Frakes, and Goldsmith.

On April 2, 2012, GNP Crescendo Records announced a limited-edition collector's CD featuring the complete score by Jerry Goldsmith (with additional music by Joel Goldsmith), newly remastered by recording engineer Bruce Botnick, with an accompanying 16-page booklet including informative notes by Jeff Bond and John Takis. The expanded album [GNPD 8079] runs 79 minutes and includes three tracks of alternates.

Themes
Frakes believes that the main themes of First Contact—and Star Trek as a whole—are loyalty, friendship, honesty, and mutual respect. This is evident in the film when Picard chooses to rescue Data rather than evacuate the ship with the rest of the crew. The film makes a direct comparison between Picard's hatred of the Borg and refusal to destroy the Enterprise and that of Captain Ahab in Herman Melville's novel Moby-Dick. The moment marks a turning point in the film as Picard changes his mind, symbolized by his putting down his phaser. A similar Moby-Dick reference was made in Star Trek II: The Wrath of Khan and although Braga and Moore did not want to repeat it, they decided it worked so well they could not leave it out.

In First Contact, the individually inscrutable and faceless Borg fulfil the role of the similarly unreadable whale in Melville's work. Picard, like Ahab, has been hurt by his nemesis, and author Elizabeth Hinds said it makes sense that Picard should "opt for the perverse alternative of remaining on board ship to fight" the Borg rather than take the only sensible option left, to destroy the ship. Several lines in the film refer to the 21st-century dwellers being primitive, with the people of the 24th century having evolved to a more utopian society. In the end, it is Lily (the 21st-century woman) who shows Picard (the 24th-century man) that his quest for revenge is the primitive behavior that humans had evolved to not use. Lily's words cause Picard to reconsider, and he quotes Ahab's words of vengeance, recognizing the death wish embedded therein.

The nature of the Borg in First Contact has been the subject of critical discussion. Author Joanna Zylinska notes that while other alien species are tolerated by humanity in Star Trek, the Borg are viewed differently because of their cybernetic alterations and the loss of freedom and autonomy. Members of the crew who are assimilated into the Collective are subsequently viewed as "polluted by technology" and less than human. Zylinska draws comparisons between the technological distinction of humanity and machine in Star Trek and the work of artists such as Stelarc. Oliver Marchart drew parallels between the Borg's combination of many into an artificial One and Thomas Hobbes's concept of the Leviathan. The nature of perilous first contact between species, as represented by films such as Independence Day, Aliens and First Contact, is a marriage of classic fears of national invasion and the loss of personal identity.

Release
1996 marked the 30th anniversary of the Star Trek franchise. The franchise was on rocky ground; ratings for Deep Space Nine and Voyager had shed millions of viewers, being bested by Hercules: The Legendary Journeys as the highest-rated syndicated series. Some fans remained upset Paramount cancelled The Next Generation at the height of its popularity, and Generations was a commercial success but not critically praised.First Contact was heavily marketed, to an extent not seen since the release of Star Trek: The Motion Picture in 1979. Several novelizations of the film were written for different age groups. Playmates Toys produced six and nine-inch action figures in addition to ship models and a phaser. Two "making of" television specials premiered on HBO and the Sci-Fi Channel, as well as being promoted during a 30th-anniversary television special on UPN. The theatrical trailer to the film was included on a Best of Star Trek music compilation, released at the same time as the First Contact soundtrack. Simon & Schuster Interactive developed a Borg-themed video game for Macintosh and Windows personal computers. The game, Star Trek: Borg, functioned as an interactive movie with scenes filmed at the same time as First Contact production. A video game adaptation of the film was also announced by Spectrum HoloByte, and would have taken the form of a real-time strategy game set entirely on the Enterprise during the Borg takeover, though it was never released. Paramount heavily marketed the film on the internet via a First Contact web site, which averaged 4.4 million hits a week during the film's opening run, the largest amount of traffic ever on a motion-picture site.

The film premiered on November 18, 1996, at Mann's Chinese Theater in Hollywood, Los Angeles. The main cast save Spiner were in attendance, as were Moore, Braga, Jerry Goldsmith, and producer Marty Hornstein. Other Star Trek actors present included DeForest Kelley, René Auberjonois, Avery Brooks, Colm Meaney, Armin Shimerman, Terry Farrell, Kate Mulgrew, Roxann Dawson, Jennifer Lien, Robert Duncan McNeill, Ethan Phillips, Tim Russ, Garrett Wang and Robert Picardo. After the screening, 1,500 guests crossed the street to the Hollywood Colonnade, where the interiors had been dressed to match settings from the film: the holodeck nightclub, part of the bridge, a "star room", the Borg hive and the "crash 'n' burn lounge". The film received a royal premiere in the United Kingdom, with the first screening attended by Charles, Prince of Wales.

Box officeFirst Contact opened in 2,812 theaters beginning November 22, grossing $30.7 million its first week and making it the top movie at the US box office. The film was knocked out of the top place the following week by 101 Dalmatians, earning $25.5 million. The film went on to gross $77 million in its first four weeks, remaining in the top-ten box office during that time. It closed with a US & Canadian gross of $92,027,888 and an international gross of $54 million for a total of $146 million worldwide.First Contact opened in Britain on December 13, 1996, at number two and was the first Star Trek film not to reach number one in that market since The Wrath of Khan. It was still a box office success, earning £8,735,340 to become the highest grossing film in the series in that territory until the release of the Star Trek reboot film in 2009. The film was the best-performing Star Trek film in international markets until 2009's Star Trek film, and Paramount's best showing in markets such as New Zealand, making $315,491 from 28 sites by year's end.

Critical responseFirst Contact garnered positive reviews on release. Audiences surveyed by CinemaScore gave the film a grade "A−" on scale of A to F. Ryan Gilbey of The Independent considered the film wise to dispense with the cast of The Original Series: "For the first time, a Star Trek movie actually looks like something more ambitious than an extended TV show," he wrote. Conversely, critic Bob Thompson felt that First Contact was more in the spirit of the 1960s television series than any previous installment. The Globe and Mail Elizabeth Renzeti said that First Contact succeeded in improving on the "stilted" previous entry in the series, and that it featured a renewed interest in storytelling. Kenneth Turan of the Los Angeles Times wrote, "First Contact does everything you'd want a Star Trek film to do, and it does it with cheerfulness and style." Adrian Martin of The Age noted that the film was geared towards pleasing fans: "Strangers to this fanciful world first delineated by Gene Roddenberry will just have to struggle to comprehend as best they can," he wrote, but "cult-followers will be in heaven". The New York Times Janet Maslin said that the "film's convoluted plot will boggle all but hard-core devotees" of the series, while Variety's Joe Leydon wrote that the film did not require intimate knowledge of the series and that fans and non-fans alike would enjoy the film. While Renzetti considered the lack of old characters from the previous seven movies a welcome change, Maslin said that without the original stars, "The series now lacks [...] much of its earlier determination. It has morphed into something less innocent and more derivative than it used to be, something the noncultist is ever less likely to enjoy." Conversely, Roger Ebert called First Contact one of the best Star Trek films, and James Berardinelli found the film the most entertaining Star Trek feature in a decade; "It has single-handedly revived the Star Trek movie series, at least from a creative point of view," he wrote.

The film's acting met with mixed reception. Lisa Schwarzbaum of Entertainment Weekly appreciated that guest stars Woodard and Cromwell were used in "inventive contrast" to their better-known images, as a "serious dramatic actress" and "dancing farmer in Babe", respectively. Lloyd Rose of The Washington Post felt that while Woodard and Cromwell managed to "take care of themselves", Frakes' direction of other actors was not inspired; Steve Persall of the St. Petersburg Times opined that only Cromwell received a choice role in the film, "so he steals the show by default". A couple of reviews noted that Data's interactions with the Borg Queen were among the most interesting parts of the film; critic John Griffin credited Spiner's work as providing "ambivalent frisson" to the feature. Empire magazine's Adam Smith wrote that some characters, particularly Troi and Crusher, were lost or ignored, and that the rapid pacing of the film left no time for those unfamiliar with the series to know or care about the characters. Likewise, Emily Carlisle of the BBC praised Woodard's, Spiner's, and Stewart's performances, but felt the film focused more on action than characterization. Stewart, whom Thompson and Renzetti considered overshadowed by William Shatner in the previous film, received praise from Richard Corliss of Time: "As Patrick Stewart delivers [a] line with a majestic ferocity worthy of a Royal Shakespeare Company alumnus, the audience gapes in awe at a special effect more imposing than any ILM digital doodle. Here is real acting! In a Star Trek film!"

The special effects were generally praised. Jay Carr of The Boston Globe said that First Contact successfully updated Star Trek creator Gene Roddenberry's concept with more elaborate effects and action. Thompson's assessment mirrored Carr's; he agreed that the film managed to convey much of the original 1960s television show, and contained enough "special effects wonders and interstellar gunplay" to sate all types of viewers. Ebert wrote that while previous films had often looked "clunky" in the effects department, First Contact benefited from the latest in effects technology. A dissenting opinion was offered by Scott, who wrote that aside from the key effects sequences, Frakes "aims to distract Trekkers from the distinctly cheap-looking remainder".

Critics reacted favorably to the Borg, describing them as akin to creatures from Hellraiser. Renzetti credited them with breathing "new life" into the crew of the Enterprise while simultaneously trying to kill them. The Borg Queen received special attention for her combination of horror and seduction; Ebert wrote that while the Queen "looks like no notion of sexy I have ever heard of", he was inspired "to keep an open mind". Carr said, "She proves that women with filmy blue skin, lots of external tubing and bad teeth can be sleekly seductive."

Accolades

Home mediaStar Trek: First Contact was first released on VHS in late 1997 as one of several titles expected to boost sluggish sales at video retailers. A LaserDisc version was also released. First Contact was among the first titles announced for the DVD-alternative rental system Digital Video Express in 1998. It was launched with five other test titles in the select markets of Richmond and San Francisco.

When Paramount announced its first slate of DVD releases in August 1998, First Contact was one of the first ten titles released in October, announced in a conscious effort to showcase effects-driven films. This version contained the feature and two trailers, but no other special features. The film was presented in its original 2.35:1 anamorphic aspect ratio, with a surround sound Dolby Digital 5.1 audio mix.

A First Contact "Special Collector's Edition" two-disc set was released in 2005 at the same time as three other Next Generation films and Star Trek: Enterprises fourth season, marking the first time that every film and episode of the franchise was available on home video up to that point. In addition to the feature, presented with the same technical specifications as the previous release and a new DTS soundtrack, the first disc contains a director's commentary by Frakes and a track by Moore and Braga. As with other special-edition DVD releases, the disc includes a text track by Michael and Denise Okuda that provides production trivia and relevant facts about the Star Trek universe. The second disc contains six making-of featurettes, storyboards, and trailers.

Paramount announced that all four Next Generation films would be released on high-definition Blu-ray on September 22, 2009. In addition to the returning DVD extras, new special features for the Blu-ray version of First Contact include "Scene Deconstruction" featurettes and a new commentary by Star Trek'' (2009) co-producer Damon Lindelof and TrekMovie.com contributor Anthony Pascale.

References
Notes

Bibliography

External links

 
 
 
 

1996 films
1990s English-language films
1990s science fiction action films
American science fiction action films
American space adventure films
American sequel films
Android (robot) films
Cyborg films
American films about revenge
Films about time travel
Films set in the 2060s
Films set in the 24th century
Films set in the future
Films set in Montana
Films shot in California
Films shot in Arizona
First Contact
First Contact
Paramount Pictures films
Films scored by Jerry Goldsmith
Films scored by Joel Goldsmith
Films directed by Jonathan Frakes
Films produced by Rick Berman
Films with screenplays by Rick Berman
Films with screenplays by Brannon Braga
Films with screenplays by Ronald D. Moore
Articles containing video clips
1996 directorial debut films
1990s American films